Pyrri was an ancient Roman settlement in Pannonia, located on the road that had connected Poetovio (today's Ptuj) in the north and Siscia (Sisak) to the south. It is believed that its location is near today's village of Komin, near Sveti Ivan Zelina, Zagreb County, Croatia.

References

Sources
 

Populated places in Pannonia
Roman sites in Croatia